Oleshkovka is a rural locality (a settlement) in Nyuksenskoye Rural Settlement, Nyuksensky District, Vologda Oblast, Russia. The population was 12 as of 2010.

Geography 
Oleshkovka is located 19 km east of Nyuksenitsa (the district's administrative centre) by road. Dunay is the nearest rural locality.

References 

Rural localities in Nyuksensky District